Dodgy are an English rock band formed in Hounslow in 1990. The band rose to prominence during the Britpop era of the 1990s. They are best known for their hits "Staying Out for the Summer", "If You're Thinking of Me", and "Good Enough".  Good Enough was their biggest hit, reaching No. 4 on the UK Singles Chart. They released their latest album, What Are We Fighting For, in September 2016.

History

Formation and initial activity (1990–97)

Dodgy were born from the ashes of Purple, a trio from Bromsgrove and Redditch, who had moved to London and was composed of Nigel Clark on bass, Mathew Priest on drums and David Griffiths on guitar. Shortly after their arrival in London in 1988, Frederic Colier joined the band as the bass guitarist, with Clark providing vocals. The new formation first settled in Battersea, using their living quarters as a rehearsal space. The quartet then relocated to a semi-detached house in Hounslow, where they turned the garage in the back garden into a sound proofed rehearsal room, using old wooden pallets and rolled up carpet stuffed into the gaps, then covered in extra carpet.

The band played in local pubs and small venues until cracks started to appear when Nigel and Mathew's direction compared negatively against Frederic and David's musical leanings.

Dissension led to the dismissal of Griffiths and Frederic, with Clark and Priest going it alone for the time being.  The two decided that a guitarist was needed. So after placing an ad in the magazine Loot, the band invited Ben Lurie, a guitarist from Australia, to join them, only to see him leave them less than a week later to join The Jesus and Mary Chain. Shortly after they discovered guitarist Andy Miller, who came from Neasden (originally Northolt (an in-band joke)). Armed with this new venture, the band decided to change its name while on a heady night out. 
 
Andy moved in with the boys in Hounslow in the early part of 1990. From then on the three of them were constantly in the garage, piecing songs together through Nigel's song writing from the night before. Their sound started to come together, not too far from what the band are now well known for, today.

Mathew, while out one night, became engrossed in a conversation with some guy who happened to manage bands. Mathew then popped a cassette tape demo of the band into the guy's jacket pocket, without him knowing anything about it. This chap turned out to be Andrew Winters. The next day, Andrew reached into his pocket, found the tape and played it, then rang the number included within the cassette case. They found their manager.
 
At the first Dodgy Club in Bacchus Wine Bar in Kingston Upon Thames, late 1990, they created a following. Playing every two weeks. Their popularity grew in many regards to Bacchus being well situated within a stone's throw of Twickenham College, Richmond College and Kingston College. Within 8 months of bi-weekly club nights at Bacchus, the boys had generated the interest of major recording and publishing labels. And in turn, some months into 1991, they signed a six album deal with A&M Records and signed publishing with BMG (after an arcade football game between Virgin and BMG exec's).

Dodgy's debut album was produced by The Lightning Seeds' Ian Broudie. The band concerned themselves with social issues by supporting The Serious Road Trip, War Child, the Liverpool Dockers' Strike, Charter 88 and youth democracy campaigns. The band became the second UK act, after China Drum, to play in Sarajevo after the lifting of the siege, giving a concert at Kuk club in August 1996. They returned to Bosnia in 1997, to film a programme with Kate Thornton in Mostar.

Post-break up and reunion (1998–present)

While Clark was absent from 1998 to 2007 to pursue ongoing solo projects, Priest and Miller continued the band as a five piece joined by the vocalist David Bassey, keyboardist Chris Hallam, and bassist Nick Abnett.  This line-up of the group would record one album, Real Estate, released in 2001, which was produced and mixed with Robin Evans at T-Pot Studios in Scotland.

The band played two sets at Guilfest music festival in Guildford, Surrey in July 2008. The first set was an acoustic set in the Unison tent where they appeared in support of the organisation. They later played a set with full band on the main stage. They headlined the Sunday night at Scarborough's Beached Festival in August 2008, and appeared at the ToneFest in September.

In November 2008, the first tracks from new recording sessions appeared online. They played a benefit show in May 2009, as part of the homelessness charity Crisis' 'Hidden Gigs' campaign, alongside The Bluetones.

In 2009, Dodgy played at the Glastonbury Festival, as well as appearances at Bug Jam 2009, Whatfest and Cornbury.

On 29 August 2010, Dodgy played at The Galtres Festival in North Yorkshire, playing Dodgy tracks such as "In a Room" and "Staying out for the Summer", as well as a version of Nigel Clark's solo track, "21st Century Man".

On 23 April 2011, Dodgy played as the headliners at the Mash Fest Festival in Trowbridge and on 28 May 2011, Dodgy headlined at the LeeStock Music Festival in Sudbury, Suffolk, helping to raise money for the Willow Foundation. Mathew Priest said in an interview with the BBC that they would be playing a mixture of new songs and old favourites and talking of their new material said "If we can just get people to listen to it, they're going to love it". on 25 August 2011, Dodgy also Headlined at the Garlic Festival, in the Isle of Wight.

For live shows promoting the album, the band recruited Stuart Thoy of the band Smoke Feathers to play bass.

In May 2012 they played at Lakefest festival.

"What Became of You" was the first single to be taken from Stand Upright in a Cool Place, their new album.  Rather than following the trend of bands re-forming to play their classic albums in full, Dodgy announced that on their recent UK tour, it was their new album that would be previewed live in its entirety. The album was released 20 February 2012 via the independent Strikeback Records, to favourable reviews from MOJO, the Guardian  and Q Magazine.

Thoy would then join the band as a full member and participate in the recording of their fifth album, What Are We Fighting For, which was released on 2 September 2016.

Musical style
AllMusic biographer Stephen Thomas Erlewine described the band as "clowns of Brit-pop" that played "infectious, goofy punk-pop", which "alternately sounded like the early Who and the Stone Roses."

Discography

Studio albums
{| class="wikitable plainrowheaders" style="text-align:center;"
|+ List of studio albums, with selected chart positions, sales figures and certifications
! scope="col" rowspan="2"| Title
! scope="col" rowspan="2"| Album details
! scope="col" colspan="1"| Peak chartpositions
! scope="col" rowspan="2"| Sales
! scope="col" rowspan="2"| Certifications
|-
! style="width:30px;"| UK
|-
! scope="row"| The Dodgy Album
|
 Released: 24 May 1993
 Label: A&M (540 082)
 Format: CD, CS, DL, LP
| 75
|
|
|-
! scope="row"| Homegrown
|
 Released: 24 October 1994
 Label: A&M (540 282)
 Format: CD, CS, DL, LP
| 28
|
|
 UK: Gold
|-
! scope="row"| Free Peace Sweet
|
 Released: 17 June 1996
 Label: A&M (540 573)
 Format: CD, CS, DL, LP
| 7
|
 UK: 400,000
|
 UK: Platinum
|-
! scope="row"| Real Estate'''
|
 Released: 23 July 2001
 Label: Bostin (BTNCD005)
 Format: CD, DL
| —
|
|
|-
! scope="row"| Stand Upright in a Cool Place|
 Released: 20 February 2012
 Label: Strike Back (SBR 200)
 Format: CD, DL, LP
| 76
|
|
|-
! scope="row"| What Are We Fighting For|
 Released: 2 September 2016
 Label: Cherry Red (BRED689)
 Format: CD, DL, LP
| —
|
|
|-
| colspan="9"| "—" denotes a release that did not chart or was not released in that territory.
|}

Compilation albums

Live albumsSo Far on 3 Wheels – Dodgy on the Radio (2007)Dodgy – Live at Cornbury Festival (2009)Dodgy Live – Back to Back'' (2013)

Singles

Downloads
"Forgive Me – Demo" (2008)
"Down in the Flood"  (2008)
"Find a Place" – The Bootleg Series and Crisis Charity Download (2009)
"Christmas at the Foodbank" (2013 charity release for The Trussell Trust)

See also
List of Britpop musicians
List of NME covers
List of performers on Top of the Pops
List of Never Mind the Buzzcocks episodes

References

External links

Dodgy's official website (launched 8 November 2008)
Dodgy's official MySpace
 Comprehensive discography
Dodgy on The Mag

Musical groups established in 1990
1990 establishments in England
English alternative rock groups
British musical trios
Britpop groups
Musical groups from the London Borough of Hounslow
Musical groups disestablished in 2002
2002 disestablishments in England
Musical groups reestablished in 2007